The term automatic vehicle tracking refers to schemes, such as that proposed by the UK's Transport Secretary Alistair Darling, in which vehicle movements are subject to involuntary mass surveillance enabled by technology rather than through use of, for example, police officers to observe vehicle movements.

The technology has been used on a voluntary basis to secure expensive vehicles with support provided by the private sector.

The UK scheme
The UK scheme has been officially described as a measure to prevent congestion by enabling targeted per-mile road charging. Some have speculated that the effect of the measure on civil liberties may be multiplied by the combined effects of several other human-rights compromises.

Specifically, the proposal follows legislation and proposed legislation to enable data retention, and prohibition on the incitement to religious hatred both of which threaten the right to free speech, and free association.

See also
 Automatic vehicle location
 Vehicle tracking system

References

Tracking
Surveillance
Vehicle technology